Parramatta metro station is a proposed station on the Sydney Metro West that will serve the Parramatta central business district. It is to be built within the block bounded by George, Macquarie, Church and Smith streets, to the north of the existing Parramatta railway station. An entrance is proposed to be built on Horwood Place, with other potential entrances still to be determined (as of March 2020). The metro station is anticipated to increase capacity at Parramatta railway station by relieving demand in peak times. It is scheduled to open with the rest of the line by 2030.

References

External links
Parramatta Metro station Sydney Metro

Proposed Sydney Metro stations
Railway stations scheduled to open in 2030
Transport infrastructure in Parramatta